The 1985–86 Czechoslovak Extraliga season was the 43rd season of the Czechoslovak Extraliga, the top level of ice hockey in Czechoslovakia. 12 teams participated in the league, and VSZ Kosice won the championship.

Regular season

Playoffs

Quarterfinal 
VSŽ Košice – HC Sparta Praha 4:2 (0:1,0:1,4:0)
VSŽ Košice – HC Sparta Praha 3:0 (1:0,1:0,1:0)
HC Sparta Praha – VSŽ Košice 6:0 (1:0,0:0,5:0)
HC Sparta Praha – VSŽ Košice 3:4 (2:1,0:2,1:1)
CHZ Litvínov – Škoda Plzeň 7:6 (2:4,3:0,2:2)
CHZ Litvínov – Škoda Plzeň 10:3 (2:1,4:1,4:1)
Škoda Plzeň – CHZ Litvínov 5:7 (2:3,1:2,2:2)
Dukla Jihlava – TJ Gottwaldov 9:4 (3:1,3:0,3:3)
Dukla Jihlava – TJ Gottwaldov 4:1 (1:1,2:0,1:0)
TJ Gottwaldov – Dukla Jihlava 2:4 (0:3,1:0,1:1)
Tesla Pardubice – Dukla Trenčín 3:1 (0:1,1:0,2:0)
Tesla Pardubice – Dukla Trenčín 4:1 (3:0,0:1,1:0)
Dukla Trenčín – Tesla Pardubice 5:2 (1:1,3:1,1:0)
Dukla Trenčín – Tesla Pardubice 5:4 PP (0:1,4:1,0:2,0:0,1:0)
Tesla Pardubice – Dukla Trenčín 2:1 (1:0,0:0,1:1)

Semifinal 
VSŽ Košice – Tesla Pardubice 2:5 (1:0,1:3,0:2)
VSŽ Košice – Tesla Pardubice 5:2 (1:0,0:1,4:1)
Tesla Pardubice – VSŽ Košice 2:9 (0:3,0:2,2:4)
Tesla Pardubice – VSŽ Košice 4:1 (3:1,0:0,1:0)
VSŽ Košice – Tesla Pardubice 4:1 (3:0,0:0,1:1)
CHZ Litvínov – Dukla Jihlava 2:4 (1:2,1:1,0:1)
CHZ Litvínov – Dukla Jihlava 6:1 (2:0,2:1,2:0)
Dukla Jihlava – CHZ Litvínov 5:4 SN (0:1,2:2,2:1,0:0,0:0,0:0)
Dukla Jihlava – CHZ Litvínov 2:3 SN (1:1,1:1,0:0,0:0,0:0,0:0)
CHZ Litvínov – Dukla Jihlava 3:4 PP (0:0,0:2,3:1,0:0,0:1)

Final 
VSŽ Košice – Dukla Jihlava 2:0 (2:0,0:0,0:0)
VSŽ Košice – Dukla Jihlava 4:2 (1:0,2:0,1:2)
Dukla Jihlava – VSŽ Košice 5:1 (2:0,1:0,2:1)
Dukla Jihlava – VSŽ Košice 4:3 SN (1:1,0:1,2:1,0:0,0:0,0:0)
VSŽ Košice – Dukla Jihlava 4:3 SN (2:2,1:1,0:0,0:0,0:0,0:0)

7th place 
HC Sparta Praha – Škoda Plzeň 1:2 (0:0,0:2,1:0)
Škoda Plzeň – HC Sparta Praha 6:5 (3:0,3:2,0:3)

5th place 
TJ Gottwaldov – Dukla Trenčín 5:3 (2:2,0:1,3:0)
Dukla Trenčín – TJ Gottwaldov 3:9 (2:0,0:6,1:3)

3rd place 
Tesla Pardubice – CHZ Litvínov 6:7 (2:1,3:5,1:1)
CHZ Litvínov – Tesla Pardubice 4:5 SN (2:3,1:1,1:0,0:0,0:0,0:0)
CHZ Litvínov – Tesla Pardubice 3:4 (1:1,2:3,0:0)

Relegation round

1. Liga-Qualification 

 TJ Vítovice – VTJ Michalovce 3:0 (4:0, 8:4, 6:2)

External links
History of Czechoslovak ice hockey

Czechoslovak Extraliga seasons
Czechoslovak
1985–86 in Czechoslovak ice hockey